Do to the Beast is the seventh studio album by American alternative rock band The Afghan Whigs, their first in 16 years. It was released on April 15, 2014 on Sub Pop Records, the same label that released their albums Up in It and Congregation.

Reception
The album received mainly positive reviews; according to online review aggregator Metacritic, it has a score of 74%, indicating "generally favorable reviews". A reviewer for the Los Angeles Times concluded that it was "overall a more muted, moody affair than the Afghan Whigs in their heyday." A Rolling Stone review wrote that on the album, "The stylishly sleazy intensity is still there on their first record since 1998's excellent 1965, only with a wider palette."

Track listing

Personnel
Adapted from AllMusic.
 Kerry Brown – engineer
 John Curley – engineer
 Amanda Demme – photography
 Greg Dulli – lyricist, mixing, producer
 Christopher Friedman – artwork, layout
 Megan Jasper – A&R
 Gavin Lurssen – mastering
 Mike Napolitano – engineer, mixing
 Rick Nelson – engineer
 David Rosser – engineer
 Mathias Schneeberger – engineer, mixing
 Justin Smith – engineer
 Christopher Thorn – engineer

Charts

Weekly charts

Year-end charts

References

The Afghan Whigs albums
2014 albums
Sub Pop albums
Albums produced by Greg Dulli